Astrothelium lucidothallinum is a species of corticolous (bark-dwelling), crustose lichen in the family Trypetheliaceae. Found in Guyana, it was formally described as a new species in 2016 by Dutch lichenologist André Aptroot. The lichen has a smooth and somewhat shiny, pale yellowish grey thallus with a cortex and a thin (0.1 mm wide) black prothallus line. The thallus contains lichexanthone, a lichen product that causes it to fluoresce yellow when lit with a long-wavelength UV light. The combination of characteristics of the lichen that distinguish it from others in Astrothelium are: the presence of lichexanthone only in the thallus; the indistinctly pseudostromatic ascomata, with  pseudostromata—whitish in colour but lacking a sharp outline; and the dimensions of the ascospores (70–90 by 18–20 μm) as well as their number per ascus (eight).

References

lucidothallinum
Lichen species
Lichens described in 2016
Lichens of Guyana
Taxa named by André Aptroot